Ortalotrypeta is a genus of tephritid  or fruit flies in the family Tephritidae.

Species
The following species are included in the genus.
 Ortalotrypeta gansuica
 Ortalotrypeta gigas
 Ortalotrypeta idana
 Ortalotrypeta idanina
 Ortalotrypeta isshikii
 Ortalotrypeta macula
 Ortalotrypeta singula
 Ortalotrypeta tibeta
 Ortalotrypeta tonkinensis
 Ortalotrypeta trypetoides
 Ortalotrypeta ziae

References

Tachiniscinae
Tephritidae genera